Bolton-upon-Dearne railway station serves the village of Bolton upon Dearne in South Yorkshire, England.

History 
Bolton-upon-Dearne railway station was opened by the Swinton and Knottingley Railway on 1 July 1879, and was originally named Hickleton. The station was renamed as Bolton-on-Dearne on 1 November 1879. The name was altered again on 15 January 1924 to become 'Bolton-on-Dearne For Goldthorpe', before reverting to 'Bolton-on-Dearne' on 12 June 1961. It was renamed Bolton-upon-Dearne on 3 April 2008.

The station was reported as being in the worst condition of any in South Yorkshire and the Passenger Transport Executive earmarked improvements to bring it up to a decent standard.  Work  to renew platforms (increase height, resurface), provide new waiting shelters and lighting was completed in November 2007. A new footbridge was opened in April 2010.

Service 
Monday to Saturday there is an hourly service to Sheffield southbound and to Leeds via  northbound.  Sundays there is also an hourly service in each direction.

In addition there are 4 services a day to York.

References

External links 

Railway stations in Barnsley
Former Swinton and Knottingley Joint Railway stations
Railway stations in Great Britain opened in 1879
Northern franchise railway stations